Eunhaesa is a head temple of the Jogye Order of Korean Buddhism.  It is located in Cheongtong-myeon, Yeongcheon, in the province of Gyeongsangbuk-do, South Korea. It stands on the eastern slopes of Palgongsan, not far from another major temple, Donghwasa.  The temple was founded by National Preceptor Hyecheol in 809.  The name means "temple of the silver sea."  The original name was "temple of the tranquil sea," Haeansa.  After the original temple burned to the ground following the Seven Year War in the 1590s, it was moved to its current location and named Eunhaesa.

See also
Korean Buddhist temples
Korean Buddhism
Korean architecture
Palgongsan

References

External links
Official website
KoreaTemple profile
Yeongcheon City profile

Religious organizations established in the 9th century
Buddhist temples in South Korea
Buildings and structures in North Gyeongsang Province
National Treasures of South Korea
Buddhist temples of the Jogye Order
Yeongcheon
9th-century establishments in Korea
Religious buildings and structures completed in 809